Rodolfo Díaz (7 May 1918 – 22 June 1993) was a Mexican basketball player. He competed in the men's tournament at the 1948 Summer Olympics.

References

1918 births
1993 deaths
Mexican men's basketball players
Olympic basketball players of Mexico
Basketball players at the 1948 Summer Olympics
Basketball players from Mexico City